Janine van Wyk (born 17 April 1987) is a South African professional soccer player who plays as a defender for her own club in South Africa JVW and captains the South Africa women's national team. She is the highest capped player in South Africa with 180 appearances, and highest capped female in CAF.

She has played for Houston Dash in the National Women's Soccer League, becoming the first South African player signed to this league. On 18 September 2018, van Wyk earned her 150th cap for the South Africa women's national soccer team, she holds the record as the most capped South African football player of any gender.

Early life and education
Van Wyk was born in Alberton, Gauteng to Dannie van Wyk. She grew up in Germiston and she started playing soccer at the age of 6. She attended Hoërskool Alberton, an Afrikaans medium school that did not play soccer. Her first girls team was Springs Home Sweepers based in KwaThema. She came out as a lesbian aged 15.

Career

Club career
A few years later, Van Wyk joined the Moroka Swallows and later, the Palace Super Falcons from Thembisa, where she was part of a team that won three consecutive league titles. Van Wyk called her time with the Super Falcons "memorable", and said that in the three league victories they were "untouchable". She then founded her own club, named JVW F.C. She previously served as player-coach for the club. Fans of football have nicknamed her "Booth".

On 21 December 2016, she signed with the Houston Dash in the National Women's Soccer League. In 2017 she made 17 appearances for the Dash. Van Wyk returned to Houston for the 2018 NWSL season, she appeared in 20 games. On 1 October 2018 van Wyk was waived by the Houston Dash and placed on re-entry waivers but her rights were not claimed by another team.

In August 2019, she signed for Danish club Fortuna Hjorring. After a knee injury during a training session and returning to South Africa, on 14 January 2020, van Wyk announced that she and Fortuna Hjorring had agreed to terminate her contract so she could focus on rehabilitation.

Van Wyk returned to Europe in July 2020 when she signed for Scottish Women's Premier League (SWPL) club Glasgow City. After making one appearance in a UEFA Women's Champions League match against VfL Wolfsburg, her SWPL debut was delayed for several months due to a combination of a knee injury and the suspension of the league during the COVID-19 pandemic.

International career
Van Wyk made her national team debut in 2005 against Nigeria in the African Women's Championship. Van Wyk scored a stunning free kick when Banyana recorded their first ever win over Nigeria since the women's national team was formed in 1993. Van Wyk scored the only goal of that match, with Banyana knocking Nigeria out of the 2012 African Women's Championship. She was a member of the South African team who played at the 2012 Summer Olympics in London, United Kingdom.  She said she was proud to represent her country at an Olympic Games, despite the team being knocked out in the first round.

Van Wyk played her 100th cap for South Africa against Namibia, winning 2–0 in August 2014. At the time, she was the second most capped South African women's player as her teammate Portia Modise won her 110th cap in the same match.

On 28 March 2016, she became South Africa's most capped player (male or female) when she made her 125th appearance against Cameroon. On 18 September 2018, she earned her 150th cap for South Africa. Van Wyk became the first Captain to lead her team to a Women's World Cup Appearance, as well as the first Captain in South Africa's history to lead a South African Team at the 2019 Women's World Cup.Van Wyk then captained the banyana banyana to their first WAFCON victory in history, this after losing their last four appearances in the final, it is due to note that although she was benched in the final against Morocco, she still got the captains perks of holding the title with the on field captain and second in command Jane Refiloe

JVW F.C. 
Van Wyk founded a football club JVW F.C. in 2013 "with the intention to focus on the development of the female football player whilst providing a platform for them to reach higher levels in the sport. Starting with only one team in 2013 that participated in the Sasol League, JVW FC has grown tremendously in the past years developing young female athletes to now having Five teams representing the Football Club" The JVW First team won the Gauteng Sasol League in 2016, where Van Wyk served as a Player-coach, and reached the Sasol League National Championship final where they ultimately lost 1–0 to Bloemfontein Celtic Ladies. A couple years later in 2019 JVW FC won the Gauteng Sasol League once again and became the National Champions beating Limpopo representatives Maindies Ladies 2–0 in the final and booked their place in the recently launched (2019) National Women's League.

Honours

Club 
Glasgow City

 Scottish Women's Premier League: 2020–21

International 
 2022 Africa Women Cup of Nations Winner
 Africa Women Cup of Nations runner-up: 2012, 2018
 2017 Confederation of African Football: Team of the Year Banyana Banyana

Individual 
South African Football Association Banyana Banyana Captain: 2013 onward
South African Football Association Best Female Player: 2010
Cosafa Women's Championship Player of the Tournament: 2011
Ekurhuleni Sports Awards Ekurhuleni Sports Woman of the Year: 2012
Gauteng Sports Awards Sports Personality of the Year: 2015
IFFHS CAF Woman Team of the Decade 2011–2020

References

External links

 
 

Living people
1987 births
People from Alberton, Gauteng
Women's association football defenders
Afrikaner people
South African women's soccer players
South Africa women's international soccer players
Footballers at the 2012 Summer Olympics
Footballers at the 2016 Summer Olympics
Olympic soccer players of South Africa
FIFA Century Club
South African expatriate soccer players
Expatriate women's soccer players in the United States
National Women's Soccer League players
Houston Dash players
South African expatriate sportspeople in the United States
2019 FIFA Women's World Cup players
South African LGBT sportspeople
LGBT association football players
Lesbian sportswomen
Fortuna Hjørring players
South African expatriates in Denmark
Expatriate women's footballers in Denmark
Glasgow City F.C. players
Sportspeople from Gauteng
Scottish Women's Premier League players
Expatriate women's footballers in Scotland
South African expatriate sportspeople in Scotland